Prasophyllum rogersii, commonly known as the Barrington Tops leek orchid is a species of orchid endemic to New South Wales. It has a single tubular leaf and up to twenty five reddish-brown flowers and only occurs in a few locations at higher altitudes.

Description
The flowers are reddish-brown or orange-brown. As with others in the genus, the flowers are inverted so that the labellum is above the column rather than below it. There is a raised, shiny callus in the centre of the labellum and extending almost to its tip. Flowering occurs in December and January.

This orchid has been confused with P. niphopedium in Victoria and with P. perangustum in Tasmania. It is closely related to P. frenchii.

Taxonomy and naming
Prasophyllum rogersii was first formally described in 1928 by Herman Rupp and the description was published in Proceedings of the Linnean Society of New South Wales. The specific epithet (rogersii) honours Richard Sanders Rogers whom Rupp described as "our recognized leader in the field of Australian orchidology".

Distribution and habitat
The Barrington Tops leek orchid grows in moist, grassy places in montane to subalpine habitats in the Barrington Tops National Park.

References

External links 
 

rogersii
Flora of New South Wales
Endemic orchids of Australia
Plants described in 1928
Taxa named by Herman Rupp